The 2021 Plymouth City Council election was held on 6 May 2021 to elect members of Plymouth City Council in England.

The Labour Party took control of the council after the 2018 election, with thirty-one members and a working majority that they held in the 2019 election. Labour defended eleven seats and the Conservatives defended eight seats. The election was originally due to take place in May 2020, but was postponed due to the COVID-19 pandemic. The Conservatives won the most seats and the popular vote, but was not able to take over the council, resulting in no overall control.

Background 
Plymouth City Council will hold local elections, along with councils across England as part of the 2021 local elections. The council elects its councillors in thirds, with a third of seats being up for election every year for three years, with no election each fourth year to correspond with councillors' four-year terms. Councillors defending their seats in this election were previously elected in 2016. In that election, eleven Labour candidates and eight Conservative candidates were elected.

Following the 2018 Plymouth City Council election, the council has been controlled by the Labour Party, initially with thirty-one councillors.

Kevin Neil, who was elected in 2018, was suspended from the Labour Party when a police investigation was launched into him. He continues to sit as an independent following the closure of the police investigation, pending an internal investigation by the party. Chaz Singh, who was first elected in 2011, left the Labour Party in September 2019 saying that his party membership was incompatible with his Sikh faith. The Labour group leader Tudor Evans said that Singh's resignation followed a conversation about Singh's conduct. Margaret Corvid, who was first elected in 2018, was suspended from the Labour Party in December 2019 over accusations of antisemitism over comments she made in 2007 about "Zionist collaboration with the Nazis". She was reinstated in February 2020 after apologising and saying that her views had changed, pointing to her speech in June 2018 in support of the Working Definition of Antisemitism developed by the International Holocaust Remembrance Alliance.

An internal Labour Party report in March 2020 predicted that the party would lose control of Plymouth City Council in the election, then scheduled for May 2020. In the same month, Nick Kelly replaced Ian Bowyer as leader of the Conservative group on the council. The election was postponed to May 2021 due to the ongoing COVID-19 pandemic. The former Conservative group leader Ian Bowyer and Tony Carson resigned from the Conservative group in October 2020 after being investigated by the party for publishing a press release advocating a reduction in the speed limit on the A38 road through the city. Six other Conservative councillors, Lynda Bowyer, Heath Cook, Richard Ball, Andrea Johnson, Nigel Churchill and Kathy Watkin also resigned from the group in protest, with all eight to sit as independent Conservatives. Kelly said that they left the group because they "couldn’t always get their own way all of the time".

In February 2021, Conservative councillors criticised the expense incurred in buying and installing a statue by Antony Gormley in West Hoe. The council clarified that the money came from a capital budget funded by grants and borrowing, and couldn't have been spent on day-to-day council operations. Labour councillors said that the funding for the statue had been approved in 2017 as part of Mayflower anniversary celebrations, when the council was controlled by the Conservatives. In March 2021, Stephen Bush wrote that the election was an opportunity for the Conservatives to gain seats due to previous UKIP performance in the city, and noted that Labour would only need to lose two seats to lose overall control of the council. In the same month, the Conservative councillor Mark Deacon was suspended from the group for 21 days after posting a photo of himself in a wig and dress to make fun of a mooted curfew for men following the death of Sarah Everard.

Previous council composition

Campaign 
Keir Starmer, the leader of the Labour Party, visited Plymouth on 7 April to campaign for the party. The Labour leader of the council Tudor Evans said that his party had already delivered most of the promises from the four-year plan published in 2018 with the remaining promises in the process of being fulfilled. The party's manifesto for the 2021 election said it would "create thousands of jobs and build more low-cost housing for rent or sale, with more help to older people, veterans, single people and residents with disabilities". Evans highlighted the diversity in backgrounds and careers that Labour candidates came from as a "brilliant reflection of Plymouth".

The Conservatives stood a candidate in all nineteen wards with elections. Of those, only two were incumbent councillors. The party published its manifesto on 13 April. It included pledges to make collection and disposal of garden waste easier, to buy the lease for Plymouth City Airport and to create a "futuristic park" on Plymouth Hoe. Other pledges included extending free parking schemes, the creation of more parking spaces and park-and-ride schemes, and seeking to make Royal Albert Bridge and Torpoint Ferry vehicle crossings free.

The Liberal Democrats said they were targeting Plymstock Dunstone in an attempt to win a seat on the council, with no current councillors being from that party. Their manifesto focused on social care and environmental issues. The Green Party said that if their candidates were elected as councillors, they would focus on accountability and involving the community in decision-making. The Trade Unionist and Socialist Coalition (TUSC) said that they would freeze council tax and end spending cuts if elected, by spending council reserves and borrowing money. Active For Plymouth, a party led by the taxi driver Jason Shopland, said they wanted to cut council tax and "automatic life sentences for rapists and paedophiles".

Emily Quick, a young mother and restaurant supervisor, is standing as an independent candidate in Southway, campaigning on local issues including litter, children's play areas, and re-establishing a post office in the area. Karen Pilkington, an independent candidate in Devonport, said she wanted to move away from party politics and cited the Flatpack Democracy model based on independent councillors' success in Frome in Somerset, under the Independents for Frome banner. Deanna Yates, an owner of the Finla Coffee coffee shop facing charges for failing to close in line with COVID-19 pandemic regulations in November 2020, is standing as an independent candidate in Plympton Erle. Danny Bamping, a director of Finla Coffee who represented the business in court, is standing as an independent candidate in Peverell. In 2020, Plymouth Council renamed John Hawkins Square after the black Plymouth Argyle footballer Jack Leslie due to concerns about historic racism and John Hawkins' status as a founder of the Atlantic slave trade. Bamping called the decision "racist" and unsuccessfully challenged the name change in court. Bamping, who said he owed the council more than £6,000 in unpaid council tax, said he wouldn't pay the council's £8,000 legal costs as the court had ordered.

Results 
Plymouth City Council released statements of persons nominated on 9 April. Asterisks denote sitting councillors seeking re-election.

Results are being announced on 7 May.

Summary

All changes in voteshare are in comparison to the corresponding 2016 election

Budshead

Compton

Devonport

Efford and Lipson

Eggbuckland

Ham

Honicknowle

Moor View

Peverell

Plympton Chaddlewood

Plympton Erle

Plympton St Mary

Plymstock Dunstone

Plymstock Radford

Southway

St Budeaux

St Peter and the Waterfront

Stoke

Sutton and Mount Gould

Aftermath 
On the night of the results, Tudor Evans, the leader of the council and the Labour group, said his party "had their backsides kicked", and that he would "find out what the voters were telling us, what they want to see different and make sure we do change". The Conservative group leader Nick Kelly said he was "absolutely ecstatic" with the results. The Green Party saw their best ever result in Plymouth, falling only 101 votes short in Plympton Chaddlewood.

The council was left in no overall control, with neither party holding a majority of the seats and the balance of power falling to the seven independent councillors. Of the independent councillors, five were former Conservatives who left the party over Kelly's leadership and two former Labour councillors. Kelly said on 11 May that he had contacted former Conservative councillors to seek their support. Evans said that Kelly's success in the election gave him the "right to make the first move" in seeking to control the council, and that Labour wouldn't seek independent support.

Kevin Neil, an independent councillor who was suspended from the Labour Party in 2019, said he would constructively oppose a new administration. The former Conservative councillors Andrea Johnson and Kathy Watkin asked to be readmitted to the Conservative group "in the spirit of how the city voted", while the remaining three former Conservatives refused to commit to signing a proposed confidence and supply agreement due to its lack of detail, saying they would instead "vote on issues on their merits".

Notes

References

Plymouth City Council election
2021
2020s in Devon